The Armstrong Siddeley Panther was a 27-litre 14-cylinder twin-row air-cooled radial aero engine developed by Armstrong Siddeley. It was originally named the Jaguar Major.

Applications
 Armstrong Whitworth Atlas Mk II
 Armstrong Whitworth A.W.XIV Starling MkII
 Armstrong Whitworth A.W.16
 Armstrong Whitworth A.W.35 Scimitar
 Fairey Gordon
 Fokker C.V
 Hawker Hoopoe
 Marinens Flyvebaatfabrikk M.F.11
 Supermarine Air Yacht
 Westland Wapiti V (first prototype)

Specifications (Panther VII)

See also

References

Notes

Bibliography

 Lumsden, Alec. British Piston Engines and their Aircraft. Marlborough, Wiltshire: Airlife Publishing, 2003. .

1920s aircraft piston engines
Aircraft air-cooled radial piston engines
Panther